In mathematical analysis, Darboux's formula is a formula introduced by   for summing infinite series by using integrals or evaluating integrals using infinite series. It is a generalization to the complex plane of the Euler–Maclaurin summation formula, which is used for similar purposes and derived in a similar manner (by repeated integration by parts of a particular choice of integrand). Darboux's formula can also be used to derive the Taylor series from calculus.

Statement
If φ(t) is a polynomial of degree n and f an analytic function then

 

The formula can be proved by repeated integration by parts.

Special cases

Taking φ to be a Bernoulli polynomial in Darboux's formula gives the Euler–Maclaurin summation formula. Taking φ to be (t − 1)n gives the formula for a Taylor series.

References

Whittaker, E. T. and Watson, G. N. "A Formula Due to Darboux." §7.1 in A Course in Modern Analysis, 4th ed. Cambridge, England: Cambridge University Press, p. 125, 1990.

External links
Darboux's formula at MathWorld

Mathematical analysis
Summability methods